Ghairat is a Pakistani television series which aired on ARY Digital. It features Iqra Aziz and Muneeb Butt in lead roles with Syed Jibran as the antagonist. Premiering on 24 July 2017, Ghairat ended its run on 13 November 2017 after 24 episodes. The story of the series revolves around Honour Killing.

Synopsis
The story revolves around Saba (Iqra Aziz). She has lived a sheltered life, all well within the constraints of patriarchal norms. Saba finds a teacher and a friend in her elder sister Iqra (Jinaan Hussain). In a tragic turn of events, their elder brother Usman (Syed Jibran) burns Iqra alive in the name of honour. Saba, who held deep respect for Usman as his elder brother who she thought couldn't even harm a fly, now sees him in a completely different light. She grows up the day she sees her sister engulfed in flames and grows out of many ideals she had grown up with.

Cast
Iqra Aziz as Saba
Muneeb Butt as Zohaib
Jinaan Hussain as Iqra; Saba's sister
Syed Jibran as Usman; Saba and Iqra's brother
Saman Ansari as Shagufta; Usman's wife
Samina Ahmad as Saba's mother
Faizan Sheikh as Adnan
Fazila Kaiser
Saad Qureshi as Kashif
Aqeel Abbas as Shagufta's Brother

References

External links 
 

2017 Pakistani television seasons